Terence Statham (born 11 March 1940) is an English former professional footballer who played in the Football League for Mansfield Town.

References

1940 births
Living people
English footballers
Association football goalkeepers
English Football League players
Mansfield Town F.C. players